The 1896–97 season was the ninth season of The Football League.

Final league tables
The tables below are reproduced here in the exact form that they can be found at the Rec.Sport.Soccer Statistics Foundation website and in Rothmans Book of Football League Records 1888–89 to 1978–79, with home and away statistics separated.

Beginning with the season 1894–95, clubs finishing level on points were separated according to goal average (goals scored divided by goals conceded), or more properly put, goal ratio. In case one or more teams had the same goal difference, this system favoured those teams who had scored fewer goals. The goal average system was eventually scrapped beginning with the 1976–77 season.

During the first five seasons of the league, that is until the season, 1893–94, re-election process concerned the clubs which finished in the bottom four of the league. From the 1894–95 season and until the 1920–21 season the re-election process was required of the clubs which finished in the bottom three of the league.

First Division

Results

Maps

Second Division

Results

Maps

Test Matches
The Football League test matches were a set of play-offs, in which the bottom First Division teams faced the top Second Division teams. Each First Division team plays both Second Division teams in a mini league format, the top two finishers would then be considered for election for First Division membership whilst the bottom two finishers would be invited to play in the Second Division.

The First Division teams, if finishing in the top two, would retain their places in the division. If a Second Division team does so, it would be considered for First Division membership through an election process. Bottom-two Second Division teams would stay in the Second Division.

First round

Second round

Test match summary
Reference works, such Encyclopedia of British Football and Association Football, present the following table with the heading given above.

Test match consequences
It is likely that the league decided on re-election to the First Division and on promotion and relegation on the basis of the summary table above.
Notts County won both fixtures and were elected to play in the 1st Division the following season.
Coming from the 2nd Division, Newton Heath apparently would have needed a win in order to advance. It appears that in this case, a draw, the preference was given to Burnley, who came to the test matches from a higher division.
Sunderland salvaged through re-elections its position in the 1st Division, having won in the second round of the test matches. It was the fate of Newton Heath to remain in the 2nd Division.

See also
1896-97 in English football
1896 in association football
1897 in association football

References

External links
Ian Laschke: Rothmans Book of Football League Records 1888–89 to 1978–79. Macdonald and Jane’s, London & Sydney, 1980.

1896-97
1